Deirdre English (born 1948) is the former editor of Mother Jones and author of numerous articles for national publications and television documentaries. She has taught at the State University of New York and currently teaches at the Graduate School of Journalism at the University of California, Berkeley, where she is a faculty mentor at the Center for the Study of the Working Family at the Graduate School of Sociology. English is co-author, with Barbara Ehrenreich, of For Her Own Good: 150 Years of the Experts' Advice along with a number of pamphlets. She contributed essays to Susan Meiselas's photography book Carnival Strippers.

In 1991, her house burned down in the Oakland Hills Fire.

Her mother is Fanita English. She was married to Don Terner, who died in a 1996 plane crash in Croatia.

Works

References

External links 

 Articles for The Nation

1948 births
20th-century American journalists
20th-century American women
American women journalists
Feminist studies scholars
Living people
Mother Jones (magazine) people
University of California, Berkeley Graduate School of Journalism faculty
21st-century American women